Sultry Serenade is an album by American jazz flautist Herbie Mann featuring tracks recorded in 1957 for the Riverside label.

Reception

Allmusic awarded the album 3 stars, stating: "This is most definitely very fine post-bop modern jazz, with a harmonic twist or turn here and there... This date should not be forgotten as one of Herbie Mann's best."

Track listing
 "Let Me Tell You" (Herbie Mann) - 4:25    
 "When the Sun Comes Out" (Harold Arlen, Ted Koehler) - 4:55    
 "Professor" (Joe Puma) - 3:43    
 "Lazy Bones" (Hoagy Carmichael, Johnny Mercer) - 7:02    
 "Sultry Serenade" (Tyree Glenn) - 5:01    
 "Little Man, You've Had a Busy Day" (Al Hoffman, Maurice Sigler, Mabel Wayne) - 5:10    
 "One Morning in May" (Carmichael) - 4:03    
 "Swing Till the Girls Come Home" (Oscar Pettiford) - 4:52  
Recorded at Reeves Sound Studios in New York City on April 1, 1957 (tracks 1, 2, 4, 5 & 7) and April 8, 1957 (tracks 3, 6 & 8)

Personnel 
Herbie Mann - flute (tracks 1, 3, 8), alto flute (tracks 2, 5, 6, 7), bass clarinet (track 4)
Jack Nimitz - baritone saxophone (tracks 1, 4), bass clarinet (tracks 2, 5, 7)
Urbie Green - trombone (tracks 1, 2, 4, 5 & 7)
Joe Puma - guitar
Oscar Pettiford - bass
Charlie Smith - drums

References 

1957 albums
Herbie Mann albums
Albums produced by Orrin Keepnews
Riverside Records albums